Pukeko Pond is a pond,  long, between Mount Loke and the west side of Denton Glacier in the Asgard Range, McMurdo Dry Valleys. Named by the New Zealand Geographic Board in 1998 after a New Zealand water bird.

References

McMurdo Dry Valleys